Peter Ramseier (29 November 1944 – 10 October 2018) was a Swiss international football player who played as a defender during the 1960s and 1970s.

Career
Ramseier began his football career at Cantonal Neuchâtel and moved to Basel in July 1966. He played through, what is now thought to be, Basel's golden years under trainer and manager Helmut Benthaus with teammates such as Paul Fischli, René Hasler, Karl Odermatt and Ottmar Hitzfeld. He won nine honours at Basel, these being six times the Swiss League, twice the Swiss Cup and the Swiss League Cup in 1972.

In an interview given in February 2014 Ramseier recalled the tie which he believed was one of the most relevant in his career. This was the first match that Basel had ever won in a European competition. In the first round of the 1970–71 European Cup Basel were drawn against Spartak Moscow. The first leg, which was played on 16 September 1970 away from home, was lost 2–3 with Odermatt and Benthaus scoring for the guests during the last 12 minutes, after they had gone three down with just a quarter of an hour left to play. In the second leg played in the St. Jakob Stadium Basel won 2–1, the goals being scored by Urs Siegenthaler und Walter Balmer. Thus the tie ended 4–4 on aggregate. Basel won on away goals and advanced to the second round.

Honours
Swiss League: 1966-67, 1968-69, 1969-70, 1971-72, 1972-73, 1976-77
Swiss Cup: 1966–67, 1974–75
Swiss League Cup: 1972

References

Notes

Sources
 Rotblau: Jahrbuch Saison 2015/2016. Publisher: FC Basel Marketing AG. 
 Josef Zindel, FC Basel:Emotionen in Rotblau, Opinio Verlag, Basel, 2001, 

1944 births
2018 deaths
Swiss men's footballers
Switzerland international footballers
Association football midfielders
FC Basel players
Neuchâtel Xamax FCS players